Floored Genius: The Best of Julian Cope and The Teardrop Explodes 1979–91 is a compilation album by Julian Cope, released in 1992, combining Cope's work with The Teardrop Explodes and his early solo work. The album contains key singles and notable album cuts from Cope's higher-profile career.

Critical reception

In his review of the album, Ned Raggett of AllMusic wrote, "One of the most striking things about Cope is how he at once incorporates any range of '60s and '70s influences, high profile or obscure, and is able to turn them all into his own sound ... and bursting with creative energy", and that Floored Genius was "crucial at showing the heights of his work".

Track listing

Charts

References

External links
 Floored Genius – The Best Of Julian Cope And The Teardrop Explodes 1979–91 on Discogs.com. Retrieved on 7 March 2018.

Julian Cope albums
The Teardrop Explodes albums
1992 compilation albums
Island Records compilation albums